Pogoń Ruska is a Polish coat of arms with Ruthenian roots. It was used by several princely families of the stock from the Rurik dynasty in the times of the Polish–Lithuanian Commonwealth.

History
The Russian Pogonia is the coat of arms of the Kyivan princes. Yaroslav the Wise had a Christian name, Yurii (George), in honor of St. George the Serpent-Slayer. The Russian Pogona depicts St. George killing a serpent. This coat of arms was worn by Russian (Ukrainian) princes, as well as cities such as Kyiv, Kamianets-Podilskyi, Volodymyr, Zbarazh, and Nizhyn. The Lithuanian Pogonia is derived from the Russian Pogonia and appeared as a coat of arms later.

Blazon
It displays Saint George defeating the Dragon.

Notable bearers
Notable bearers of this coat of arms include:
Czetwertyński family
 Seweryn Franciszek Światopełk-Czetwertyński
 Antoni Stanisław Czetwertyński-Światopełk
 Former coat of arms of the Ostrogski family

See also
 Coat of arms of Georgia (country)
 Coat of arms of Russia
 Pogoń Litewska
 Polish nobility
 Ruthenian nobility

References

Polish coats of arms
Saint George and the Dragon